Indiana Borough 1912 Municipal Building is a historic municipal building located at Indiana, Indiana County, Pennsylvania.  It was built in 1912, and is a -story, three-bay by five-bay brick building in the Dutch Colonial Revival-style.  The front facade features a uniquely shaped, stepped and arched parapet and elongated arcaded windows.  It is reminiscent of 17th-century Dutch Town Halls.

It was added to the National Register of Historic Places in 1983.

References

Indiana, Pennsylvania
Buildings and structures in Indiana County, Pennsylvania
1912 establishments in Pennsylvania
Government buildings completed in 1912
Government buildings on the National Register of Historic Places in Pennsylvania
National Register of Historic Places in Indiana County, Pennsylvania
Colonial Revival architecture in Pennsylvania
Individually listed contributing properties to historic districts on the National Register in Pennsylvania